Choodatha Pookal is a 1985 Indian Malayalam film,  directed by M. S. Baby and produced by V. Gopalakrishnan Nair. The film stars Sukumaran, Lakshmi, Ratheesh and T. R. Omana in the lead roles. The film has musical score by K. J. Joy.

Cast

Sukumaran as Mohan
Ratheesh as Prem
Shankar as Ravi
Lakshmi as Hema
Zarina Wahab as Sreedevi
Kalpana
T. G. Ravi as Warrier
T. R. Omana
Vijay Menon as Suresh 
Prathapachandran
Balan K. Nair
Kunchan
Master Vimal

Plot 

Hema, Prem, Ravi & Sreedevi were College mates. Prem and Ravi liked Hema, but she saw them as friends. During her MBBS course, Hema meets Mohan and fell in love with him. Mohan also reciprocates it. Mohan had to leave for home owing to poor health of his father where he marries Sreedevi being last wish of his father. Hema learns about it from a letter sent by Mohan.

Hema is a leading Surgeon in a hospital now. Accidentally she meets Sreedvi & Mohan while Sreedevi is not aware of the past relationship of Mohan. Hema saves the life of Mohan's son who met with an accident on the day when Hema lost her brother in an accident. Sreedevi tries to renew friendship with Hema while Mohan is worried whether Hema's visit will spoil his family.

Sreedevi discovers the past relationship of Hema and Mohan from a letter she discovered from Hema's house. Sreedevi doubts both Mohan and Hema. Sreedevi plans to leave Mohan for their past relationship and suspicion and Hema sacrifices her life to avoid separation of the couple because of her.

Soundtrack
The music was composed by K. J. Joy and the lyrics were written by Poovachal Khader and O. N. V. Kurup.

References

External links
 

1985 films
1980s Malayalam-language films